Ernest Philippe Gaudin (1882 – August 1911) was a professional golfer from Jersey. Gaudin had four brothers who were also professional golfers: his older brothers Willie, Jack and Phil, along with his younger brother Herbert.

Golf career
Gaudin's best season was 1910 when he tied for 8th place in the Open Championship when he carded rounds of 78-74-76-81=309.  He was also one of the runners-up in the Tooting Bec Cup. Gaudin has been joint leader in the Tooting Bec Cup after a first-round 74.

Gaudin joined his brother Willie at Manchester Golf Club in about 1903, becoming an assistant professional. In 1906 Ernest moved south to Fulwell Golf Club in Twickenham. In 1907 he moved to Felixstowe Golf Club, to Worplesdon Golf Club in 1908 and finally to Tyneside Golf Club in 1911.

Death
Gaudin died of pneumonia in August 1911 in Ryton, County Durham, England—at the young age of just 28—soon after taking the position at Tyneside.

Results in major championships

Note: Gaudin only played in The Open Championship.

WD = Withdrew
"T" indicates a tie for a place

References

Jersey male golfers
People from Grouville
Deaths from pneumonia in England
1882 births
1911 deaths